The Western Illinois Leathernecks football program is the intercollegiate American football team for Western Illinois University located in Macomb, Illinois. The team competes in the NCAA Division I Football Championship Subdivision (FCS) and are members of the Missouri Valley Football Conference. The school's first football team was fielded in 1903. The team plays its home games at the 16,368 seat Hanson Field.

History
Western Illinois had an unofficial football team in 1902, the year the school was established. The team played four games against regional high schools and the Western Illinois Normal & Business Institute. In 1903, the school formed an athletic association for the fall football season, which is considered the official beginning of Western Illinois football by the school.

The team adopted its nickname in 1927 when coach Ray Hanson, a decorated officer in the United States Marine Corps, asked the U.S. Navy for permission to use the Corps' Fighting Leathernecks nickname and logo for his team. Western Illinois is the only college which officially takes its nickname from a branch of the U.S. military.

Conference affiliations

Championships

Conference championships

† Co-championship

Playoffs and bowls

Playoffs

*Note: Since 1981, the NCAA Division I-AA/Division I FCS Playoffs Regional Championships were commonly referred to as the Boardwalk Bowl (East Region Championship), Pecan Bowl (Midwest Region Championship), Grantland Rice Bowl (South Region Championship), and Camellia Bowl (West Region Championship).

Bowl games

Head coaches

† Acting head coach first seven games of 2008 season and last eight games of 2009 season.

Records

Stadium

Hanson Field

Hanson Field is a 16,368-seat multi-purpose stadium in Macomb, Illinois, USA. The stadium which opened in 1950 is home to the Western Illinois Leathernecks football team and track and field team. The field is named after former WIU football coach/A.D. and Marine legend Rock Hanson. A unique feature of the facility is an extensive hillside that surrounds the field allowing for additional seating for thousands of spectators. Outside the stadium, a statue of former WIU track and field coach and two time Olympic gold medalist Lee Calhoun stands and a bulldog statue is located at the main entrance.

Highest-Scoring GameOn September 11, 2004, Western Illinois defeated Division II Cheyney State 98–7.

College Football Hall of Fame members

Coaches
 Darrell Mudra

Notable former players

Notable alumni
 Don Beebe
 David Bowens 
 Sam Clemons
 Bryan Cox
 Rodney Harrison
 Leroy Jackson
 Lance Lenoir
 Khalen Saunders
 Mike Scifres
 Rich Seubert
 Aaron Stecker
 Brett Taylor
 Reggie Waddell
 Mike Wagner
 Jason Williams
 Frank Winters
 Jaelon Acklin

Western Illinois Leathernecks selected in the NFL Draft

Future non-conference opponents 
Announced schedules as of December 9, 2022.

See also
 Western Illinois Leathernecks
 List of NCAA Division I FCS football programs

References

External links
 

 
American football teams established in 1903
1903 establishments in Illinois